Papakura Normal School is a coeducational state primary school of Papakura in Auckland, New Zealand.

The school is located approximately 30 kilometres south of the Auckland City Centre, situated on the suburban boundary of Takanini and Papakura.

The school educates children from years 0 to 8 (5-year-old to 12-year-old students).

Papakura Normal School opened in 1953 as Papakura North School situated on the boundary of Papakura Military Camp.

During 1958, the school's name North changed to Normal, The word Normal represents the word normale from the French language which means teaching school. At that time a models block was set up and operated as an independent "school within a school". This was to provide opportunities for trainee teachers to experience teaching in a small rural environment.  The models block was closed in 2008 and Papakura Normal School went from a small rural school, to what is now known as a large, popular urban school.

A new classroom block and administration area were built in 2007 next to the Walters Road entrance. An extensive upgrade to the school's buildings began in 2008 with the senior and models blocks being the first to be improved. The Junior block is due for upgrading in 2010.

The school draws from a large range of socio-economic backgrounds, with 54% of the school's pupils being of Māori descent in July 2009.

The school doesn't just have adult leaders it has school leaders and head boy/girl which is picked from year 8's picked by both students and teachers count. Papakura Normal has head students to guide the younger generation at their school and to create a bright road for both their learning and their hauora.

The school's current Principal, Judy Morgan, is retiring in May 2017. Her successor is Derek Linington.

References

Educational institutions established in 1953
Primary schools in Auckland
Intermediate schools in New Zealand
1953 establishments in New Zealand